Kathy La Sauce (born ) is a former United States Air Force (USAF) pilot. She was the first woman to pilot a C-141 Starlifter, and the first woman aircraft commander at Norton Air Force Base.

She began flight training at Williams Air Force Base on September 29, 1976 with a group of women, Undergraduate Pilot Training (UPT) class 77-08, many of whom would go on to attain notable achievements in their field. The class became the USAF's first class of women graduates on Sept. 2,1977. La Sauce and the other members of UPT class 77-08 were inducted to the Women in Aviation, International Pioneer Hall of Fame in 2016.

She reached the rank of lieutenant colonel.

See also
Women in aviation

References 

1949 births
Living people
United States Air Force officers